Favartia lindae is a species of sea snail, a marine gastropod mollusk in the family Muricidae, the murex snails or rock snails.

Description
Original description: "Shell small for genus, thin, delicate, elongated, fusiform; 5 varices per whorl; 6 major cords around body whorl, with 1 minor cord in-between; cords frilly, fimbriated; varices coarsely ribbed, cancellated; siphonal canal with 2 large, fimbriated cords; siphonal cords end in 2 large spines on each varix on siphonal canal; aperture large in proportion to shell size; shell color pale tan with varices being darker tan-brown; spire elevated; protoconch and early whorls brown."

Distribution
Locus typicus: "(Dredged from) 150 metres depth
50 kilometres South of Apalachicola, Florida, USA."

References

Muricidae
Gastropods described in 1987